James "Jimmy" or "Bow" Ford was an American soccer outside right who earned one cap with the  U.S. national team in 1916.  He played professionally in the National Association Football League and the American Soccer League, scoring goals in the first two National Challenge Cup Finals.

Professional career
The son of English immigrants, Ford was born in 1889 in Kearney, New Jersey.  In 1913, Ford, along with his brother John, turned professional with the Brooklyn Field Club of the National Association Football League.  In 1914, Brooklyn won the 1914 National Challenge Cup with Ford scoring the winning goal in the 87th minute.  Later in 1914, Ford signed with Bethlehem Steel  On May 3, 1915, Ford scored in his second consecutive Challenge Cup final, as Bethlehem defeated Brooklyn Celtic.  However, he soon after moved to Jesey City in the New Jersey National League.  In the spring of 1916, he went on loan to New York Clan MacDonald.  In 1916, he was with Kearny Ryerson, also known as Kearny A.C., when he was called up for the first official U.S. national team games.  That fall, he signed with the Kearny Scots and played with the team until inducted into the army when the United States entered World War I.  After serving with the 29th Division in France.  In 1919, he joined Bethlehem for a tour of Scandinavia.  In 1920, he joined Erie A.A. of the NAFBL.  In 1921, Erie joined the newly established American Soccer League and changed its name to Harrison S.C.  In 1923, he moved to the New York Giants, then to the Newark Skeeters in 1924.  He retired in 1925.

National team
Ford earned his one cap with the national team  in its first official game, a 3-2 victory over Sweden on August 20, 1916.

References

External links
 Hidden Caps: James Ford

1889 births
Year of death missing
People from Kearny, New Jersey
Soccer players from New Jersey
American soccer players
American Soccer League (1921–1933) players
Brooklyn Field Club players
Bethlehem Steel F.C. (1907–1930) players
Erie A.A. (NAFBL) players
Harrison S.C. players
Jersey City (soccer) players
Kearny Scots (NAFBL) players
National Association Football League players
New York Giants (soccer) players
Newark Skeeters players
Sportspeople from Hudson County, New Jersey
United States men's international soccer players
Association football forwards